The 1932 Princeton Tigers football team represented Princeton University in the 1932 college football season. The Tigers finished with a 2–2–3 record under first-year head coach Fritz Crisler. No Princeton players were selected as first-team honorees on the 1932 College Football All-America Team.

Prior to 1932, Crisler was the head football coach at Minnesota. In February 1932, he was signed to a three-year contract with Princeton at an annual salary in excess of $10,000.

Schedule

References

Princeton
Princeton Tigers football seasons
Princeton Tigers football